Race Torquay is a one-day cycling race held annually in Australia since 2020. The race is held a few days before the Cadel Evans Great Ocean Road Race. It is rated as a 1.1 event on the UCI Oceania Tour.

Winners

Men's race

Women's race

References

Cycle races in Australia
Recurring sporting events established in 2020
UCI Oceania Tour races
2020 establishments in Australia